The 123 megawatt (MW) Red Hills Wind Farm is located in Roger Mills and Custer counties, near Elk City, Oklahoma. The wind farm has 82 Acciona 1.5-MW wind turbines, and the Red Hills facility is spread across . Acciona Energy North America opened the wind farm in June 2009. 

Red Hills Wind Farm created 15 new full-time local jobs and more than 200 people were employed during the construction phase. Long-term lease agreements have been completed with 12 local landowners or land trusts. With the exception of the small footprint made by the 82 turbines, at about  each, land use is dominated by cattle grazing which co-exists with the wind power production.

See also

Wind power in the United States
List of onshore wind farms

References

Buildings and structures in Custer County, Oklahoma
Buildings and structures in Roger Mills County, Oklahoma
Energy infrastructure completed in 2009
Wind farms in Oklahoma